Groznensky District (Sölƶa-Ġalin khoşt) is an administrative and municipal district (raion), one of the fifteen in the Chechen Republic, Russia. It is located in the central and western parts of the republic. The administrative center of the administrative district is the rural locality (a selo) of Tolstoy-Yurt; however, the city of Grozny serves as the administrative center of the municipal district, even though it is incorporated separately from it within the framework of municipal divisions. Population:  126,940 (2002 Census);

References

Notes

Sources

External links
Official website of Groznensky District 
Official website of the Chechen Republic. Information about Groznensky District 

Districts of Chechnya

